Phasmarhabditis neopapillosa is a nematode in the family Rhabditidae. It is a lethal facultative parasite of the terrestrial gastropods (slugs and snails).

References

Rhabditidae